Inkawasi-Kañaris is a variety of Quechua spoken in the districts of Incahuasi and Cañaris, Ferreñafe in the Peruvian region of Lambayeque.

Inkawasi-Kañaris Quechua belongs to Quechua II, subgroup Cajamarca–Cañaris (Quechua II a, Yunkay) and is closest to Cajamarca Quechua, with which it has 94% lexical similarity.

References

Bibliography
Ronel Groenewald et al. (2002): Shumaq liyinawan yaĉakushun - Aprendamos con los cuentos bonitos

External links 
 La semántica de quechua de Inkawasi
 Guía de la langua quechua para histanohablantes - Quechua de Lambayeque (SIL, 2007).
 Proyecto diccionario linwaras – castellano. Inkawasi Kañaris. Plataforma para el estudio, la promoción y la difusión de la cultura de los kiĉwahablantes de Lambayeque.

Languages of Peru
Quechuan languages